The vice president of Mongolia was a political position in Mongolian People's Republic from 1990 to 1992. The position was filled by vote in Little Khural at the same time as President of Mongolia. The position was abolished in the 1992 Constitution of Mongolia.

References

Politics of Mongolia
Government of Mongolia
Mongolian People's Republic
Mongolia
Titles held only by one person